Nashville Historic District may refer to:

 Nashville Historic District (Nashua, New Hampshire), listed on the NRHP in New Hampshire
 Nashville Historic District (Nashville, North Carolina), listed on the NRHP in North Carolina
East Nashville Historic District, Nashville, Tennessee, listed on the NRHP in Tennessee
Nashville Financial Historic District, Nashville, Tennessee, listed on the NRHP in Tennessee